Monolisk is a 2019 independent action role-playing game developed by Trickster Arts for Android and iOS. It was released on 15 October 2019.

Gameplay
The game combines action role-playing game with collectible card game and "Mario Maker." The game allows player to create their own dungeons and publish them online for other players. Player usually controls his own hero and searches through dungeon created by other players. He comes across various enemies and can use multiple abilities to use against enemies. Abbilities are dependent on which character player chooses. Characters have different abilities and skills. Knights use raw power for example.

Development
The game was announced on 28 May 2019.

Reception

References

External links

Trickster Arts's website

Action role-playing video games
Indie video games
Fantasy video games
Free-to-play video games
Video games developed in the Czech Republic
Android (operating system) games
IOS games
2019 video games
Multiplayer and single-player video games